The 2000 United States House of Representatives elections in Colorado were held on November 7, 2000, with all six House seats up for election.  The winners served from January 3, 2001, to January 3, 2003.

Overview

Results

District 1

District 2

District 3

District 4

District 5

District 6

References

United States House of Representatives elections in Colorado
2000 Colorado elections